Assiminea lutea is a species of minute operculate snail, a marine gastropod mollusk or micromollusk in the family Assimineidae.

Parasites
Parafossarulus anomalospiralis is the first intermediate host for:
 trematode Clonorchis sinensis

References

External links

Assimineidae
Gastropods described in 1861